Winner's Circle is a 1958 album by jazz musicians who came first or second in Down Beats critics' poll of 1957.

Track listing
"Lazy Afternoon"
"Not So Sleepy"
"Seabreeze"
"Love and the Weather"
"She Didn't Say Yes"
"If I'm Lucky (I'll Be the One)"
"At Home with the Blues"
"Turtle Walk"

Personnel
Recorded September and October 1957 in New York City

Personnel on tracks 1, 3, 5 & 7, recorded September 1957: 
Art Farmer – trumpet 
Rolf Kühn – clarinet 
Eddie Costa – vibraphone [out on track 7]
Kenny Burrell – guitar
Oscar Pettiford – double bass
Ed Thigpen – drums
Harry Tubbs – arranger

Personnel on tracks 2, 4, 6 & 8, recorded October 1957:
Donald Byrd – trumpet
Frank Rehak – trombone
Gene Quill – alto saxophone [track 2 only]
John Coltrane – tenor saxophone
Al Cohn – baritone saxophone
Eddie Costa – piano
Freddie Green – rhythm guitar  [track 2 only]
Oscar Pettiford – double bass
Ed Thigpen – drums [out on track 2]
Philly Joe Jones – drums [track 2 only]
Harry Tubbs – arranger

References

1958 albums
Oscar Pettiford albums
John Coltrane albums
Bethlehem Records albums